Săptămâna Clujeană is a Romanian language financial weekly newspaper published in Cluj-Napoca.

External links
Official website

Newspapers published in Cluj-Napoca
Publications with year of establishment missing